The Royal Victorian Order is an order of knighthood awarded by the sovereign of the United Kingdom and several Commonwealth realms. It is granted personally by the monarch and recognises personal service to the monarchy, the Royal Household, royal family members, and the organisation of important royal events. The order was officially created and instituted on 23 April 1896 by letters patent under the Great Seal of the Realm by Queen Victoria. It was instituted with five grades, Knight Grand Cross (GCVO), Knight Commander (KCVO), Commander (CVO), Member (fourth class) and Member (fifth class), the last two of which were abbreviated to MVO. The two highest conferred the status of knighthood on holders; in 1984, the grade of Member (fourth class) was renamed Lieutenant (LVO), and holders of the fifth grade became Members. Women were not admitted until 1936; those receiving the highest two awards were styled Dames and those grades, when conferred on women, are Dame Grand Cross and Dame Commander (DCVO). The order could also be conferred on foreigners, who were typically appointed to honorary grades and were thus not entitled to the styles, such as Sir and Dame, associated with ordinary grades.

No limit was placed on the number of appointments which could be made. The first two appointments were to Queen Victoria's sons, Albert, Prince of Wales, and Prince Arthur, Duke of Connaught and Strathearn, who both received the highest grade on 6 May 1896. The first honorary GCVO to be appointed was Arsène Henry, the Prefect of the Alpes Maritimes, France, two days later. Queen Victoria appointed 19 Knights Grand Cross, plus an additional 28 honorary Knights Grand Cross, between the order's institution and her death on 22 January 1901; of those 19, six were to Princes of the United Kingdom—her own children, grandchildren or other close relatives—and a further seven to those already holding a peerage.

The foreign appointments included 14 Germans, six Russians, two Frenchmen, and one Austro-Hungarian, Chinese, Dane, Egyptian, Montenegrin and Spanish citizens. The King of Spain, Emperor of Germany and Prince of Montenegro were among them, along with several German princes and courtiers from Russia and Germany. Five honorary appointments were made to mark the Coronation of Nicholas II of Russia in 1896 and four to mark the occasion of the German Emperor's visit to England in 1899.

Appointed by Queen Victoria 
The list below is ordered by date of appointment. Full names, styles, ranks and titles are given where applicable, as correct at the time of appointment to the order. Branch of service or regiment details are given in parentheses to distinguish them from offices. The offices listed are those given in the official notice, printed in the London Gazette. Where applicable, the occasion is given that was listed either with the notices or in published material elsewhere, in which case that material is cited.

See also 

 List of Knights Grand Cross of the Royal Victorian Order appointed by King Edward VII

References

Bibliography 
 P. Duckers (2004), British Orders and Decorations (Princes Risborough: Shire Publications Ltd)
 C. McCreery (2008), On Her Majesty's Service: Royal Honours and Recognition in Canada (Toronto: Dundurn Press)
 W.M. Shaw (1906), The Knights of England, volume i (London: Sherratt and Hughes; OCLC 185192520)

Citations 

British honours system
Royal Victorian Order
Queen Victoria
Royal Victorian